Mickey Quinn is a former Gaelic footballer from County Leitrim, Ireland. Along with Seamus Quinn he is the only other Leitrim man to win an All Star award, he is also one of the finest Gaelic footballers Leitrim ever produced, Quinn won an All Star at Midfield in 1990 and at the time was only the second player to have never played in Croke Park to win one. In 1994 he was part of the county's memorable Connacht Senior Football Championship victory. He also won an All Ireland B Titles in 1990. He won Leitrim Senior Football Championship titles in 1989, 1992, 1993, 1994 with Aughawillan. In 2010 he managed Aughawillan to the Leitrim Intermediate Football Championship.

Honours
 1 Connacht Senior Football Championship (1994)
 1 All Ireland B Football Championship (1990)
 1 All Star Award (1990)
 8 Leitrim Senior Football Championships (1976, 1978, 1983, 1984, 1989, 1992, 1993, 1994)

References

Year of birth missing (living people)
Living people
Aughawillian Gaelic footballers
Leitrim inter-county Gaelic footballers
Sportspeople from County Leitrim